Pine Mountain is a summit in St. Francois County in the U.S. state of Missouri. The mountain is about 3.5 miles south of Bismarck along Missouri Route N. The peak rises just south of the confluence of Indian Creek with the St. Francis River.

Pine Mountain was so named after the amount of immense of pine trees on its summit.

References

 Mountains of St. Francois County, Missouri
 Mountains of Missouri